Composia credula is a moth of the family Erebidae. It was described by Johan Christian Fabricius in 1775. It is found in the Antilles (Cuba, Jamaica, Hispaniola, Puerto Rico, the Virgin Islands), as well as in South and possibly Central America.

References

Composia
Moths described in 1775
Taxa named by Johan Christian Fabricius